Glenea krausemani is a species of beetle in the family Cerambycidae. It was described by Stephan von Breuning in 1958. It is known from Moluccas.

References

krausemani
Beetles described in 1958